Happy Ending is a 2012 South Korean television series starring Choi Min-soo, Shim Hye-jin and Lee Seung-yeon. It aired on JTBC from April 23 to July 16, 2012.

Synopsis
The series revolves around Kim Doo-soo (Choi Min-soo)'s family after he learns that he is terminally ill.

Cast

Main
 Choi Min-soo as Kim Doo-soo
 Shim Hye-jin as Yang Sun-ah
 Lee Seung-yeon as Hong Ae-ran

Supporting
 So Yoo-jin as Kim Geum-ha
 Kim So-eun as Kim Eun-ha
 Yeon Joon-seok as Choi Dong-ha
 Park Jung-chul as Lee Tae-pyung
 Kangta as Goo Seung-jae
 So Yi-hyun as Park Na-young
 Ha Seung-ri as Park Na-ri
 Choi Bool-am as Doo-soo's father
 In Gyo-jin as Lee Seong-hoon
 Jang Da-na as Ji-min
 Yoo Jang-young as Young-shik
 Maeng Sang-hoon as Director Oh
 Han Mi-jin as Team leader Hong
 Kang Dong-yup as Reporter Choi
 Ryu Kyung-soo as Park Jeong-ho

Ratings
In this table,  represent the lowest ratings and  represent the highest ratings.

References

External links
  
 
 

JTBC television dramas
Korean-language television shows
2012 South Korean television series debuts
2012 South Korean television series endings
Television series about cancer
Television series by Logos Film